Gav Sefid-e Bozorg (also Romanized as Gāv Sefīd-e Bozorg and Gāv Sefīd Bozorg; also known as Chāh Sefīd Bozorg, Gāh Sefid Buzurg, and Gāv Sefīd) is a village in Rudhaleh Rural District, Rig District, Ganaveh County, Bushehr Province, Iran. At the 2006 census, its population was 347, in 78 families.

References 

Populated places in Ganaveh County